Alessandro Borgese (born 9 May 1985) is an Italian footballer who plays for Castelfidardo Calcio.

Until 2014, Borgese spent most of his professional career in Italian Lega Pro, except in 2010–11 season .

Biography
Born in Palermo, Sicily, Borgese joined Vicenza Calcio along with Antonino Bonvissuto in 2003, initially in a loan deal.

Ancona
In 2005, he left for Ancona in a co-ownership deal, for €250, joining Bonvissuto (loan). In June 2006 Ancona acquired the remain 50% registration rights from Vicenza.

Sassuolo
He was sold to Sassuolo in 2007 in another co-ownership deal.

Monza
After the team winning Group A of 2007–08 Serie C1 and acquired the remain 50% registration rights from Ancona, Borgese was sold back to Lega Pro Prime Division (ex- Serie C1) in another co-ownership deal.

Foligno
However, he only spent half-season in Monza, which he left for Foligno along with Christian Cesaretti. In June 2009 Monza also acquired the remain half from Sassuolo. However, he was transferred to Foligno again in a 1-year contract.

Perugia
In September 2010 he left for Serie D club Perugia The team won the champion of Group E and promoted back to professional league. In June 2011 his contract was renewed.

Return to Foligno

Chieti

Serie D career
Since 2014 Borgese was a player of Serie D. Due to the shirking of Lega Pro from two divisions to one division, the amateur level (de facto semi-pro) became the fourth level of Italian football. Borgese joined Matelica circa December 2014. He also renewed his contract in June 2015.

References

External links
 
 AIC.Football.it Profile 
 LaSerieD.com Profile 

Italian footballers
L.R. Vicenza players
A.C. Ancona players
U.S. Sassuolo Calcio players
A.C. Monza players
A.S.D. Città di Foligno 1928 players
A.C. Perugia Calcio players
Association football midfielders
Footballers from Palermo
1985 births
Living people